Chiavari is a comune (municipality) in the Metropolitan City of Genoa, in Italy. It has about 28,000 inhabitants. It is situated near the river Entella.

History

Pre-Roman and Roman Era
A pre-Roman necropolis, which dates from the 8th to 7th century BC, has been uncovered in the area where Chiavari is located now.
Chiavari grew up on the traces of a Roman camp on the Via Aurelia.

Medieval Era
A castle was constructed in 1147. The old town contains numerous arcades and buildings from the 13th century, including a castle, several mansions, and the nearby Church of San Salvatore di Lavagna, which was founded in 1224 by Innocent IV.

The cathedral was rebuilt in 1613. Known famously as a center of ancient humanistic tradition, Chiavari has a public library with a collection of manuscripts and incunabula. After the discovery of the conspiracy of the Fieschi, in 1542, and the capture of Chiavari by the Counts of Lavagna, the town suffered much, being associated with the conspirators. Among its illustrious citizens were: Luca Cantiano di Moneglia, founder of an Art Academy, and Giuseppe Gregorio Solari, translator of many Latin poets.

19th century 
From 1805 to 1814, Chiavari served as the capital of the short-lived Apennins Departments of France of the First French Empire. Chiavari is the home of the Chiavari chair designed in 1807 by a local, Giuseppe Gaetano Descalzi. The chair was a success and led to the opening of many factories in Chiavari and surrounding towns. Chiavari railway station was opened in 1868; it is located in a passageway between the town centre and the beach-side.

20th century 
Colonia Fara building was built in 1935 during the Fascist regime.

Sports
In 2014 the team football team Virtus Entella was promoted in the Italian Serie B for the first time in history and was relegated back to the third division after 4 years in 2018.

Notable people
Nelson le Follet

References

External links

  
 

Cities and towns in Liguria
Coastal towns in Liguria